Kannan En Kadhalan is a 1968 Indian Tamil-language film, directed by P. Neelakantan, produced and written by R. M. Veerappan, starring M. G. Ramachandran, Jayalalithaa and Vanisri. It was released on 25 April 1968.

Plot 

Kannan is the adopted son of a retired Captain. Sundar is the real son. Mallika is the niece of this rich man, who is engaged, at birth to Sundar. Mallika is secretly in love with Kannan. Malathi lost her father in an accident; she now lives with the widow as her adopted daughter. Malathi and Kannan fall in love as they share good bonding. Kannan and Sundar aren't on good terms. Sundar's behaviour towards Mallika and Malathi is not appropriate. Kannan warns Sundar, but an irritated Sundar kills Kannan and forcefully marries Mallika and Malathi. Years passed, he is blessed with kids and his wives name one son as Kannan. The film ends.

Cast 
 M. G. Ramachandran as Kannan
 Jayalalithaa as Maliga
 Vanisri as Malathi
 R. Muthuraman as The engineer Sundaram
 S. A. Ashokan as Doctor Singh
 Cho Ramaswamy as Pathapi / Sabapathy
 Thengai Srinivasan as Sheshastri Iyer
 J. P. Chandrababu (Guest-Star) as Chandran
 O. A. K. Thevar as Singaram
 Usilaimani as The false astrologer
 Ganthimathi as Neelambigai Ammu
 Rama Prabha as Girija
Ennathe Kannaiya as Kulasekaran
 Karikol Raju as Advocate
 Shanmugasundari as Shanmugapriya Malliga's aunt
 Trichy Soundararajan as The Captain Gopal, redeemed military officer
 Justin as a goon in the cabaret
 Vijaya Chandrika as Malathi's friend

Soundtrack 
The music was composed by M. S. Viswanathan. The song "Paaduvor Paadinaal" was composed using various Indian classical and western instruments, most notably the piano, and is a "jazz-meets-Indian folk redux".

Release and reception 
Kannan En Kadhalan was released on 25 April 1968. The Indian Express in its review dated 17 May 1968 wrote, "Director P. Neelakantan has made the film racy in tempo; there is not a moment of flagging interest". Kalki called the film as attractive as its title.

References

External links 
 

1960s Tamil-language films
1968 films
Films directed by P. Neelakantan
Films scored by M. S. Viswanathan